Merti is a small town in Isiolo County in northern Kenya. Merti is one of the upcoming urban centres in Isiolo County. It is also the capital of Merti sub-county, which has a population of 47,206.

Merti is located just over 140 km northeast of county capital Isiolo town, along the Ewaso Ng'iro River. Beside it is the Merti plateau

References

Populated places in Isiolo County